This is a list of Members of Parliament elected in the 1925 Northern Ireland general election. Elections to the 2nd Northern Ireland House of Commons were held on 3 April 1925.

All members of the Northern Ireland House of Commons elected at the 1925 Northern Ireland general election are listed.

Sir James Craig, (later Viscount Craigavon) continued as Prime Minister following the election. The second place Nationalist Party ended its policy of abstentionism and took their seats but refused to accept the role of Official Opposition.

Members

Changes

 Philip James Woods (Independent Unionist) was elected in both the Belfast West and Belfast South constituencies. He declined the Belfast South seat resulting in a by-election held on 6 November 1925, which was won by Anthony Brutus Babington (UUP).

References
Biographies of Members of the Northern Ireland House of Commons

1925